George Kasson Frazier (January 7, 1861 – February 5, 1913) was a 19th-century professional baseball executive. He was the owner and manager of the Syracuse Stars of the American Association, considered a major league, during the 1890 season. He managed the Stars to a record of 51–65. The team also went 4–7 in 11 games managed by Wallace Fessenden in mid-season. The Stars finished in seventh place, and folded at the conclusion of the season.

References

External links

George Frazier managerial career statistics at Retrosheet.org

1861 births
1913 deaths
Major League Baseball owners
Major League Baseball managers
Sportspeople from Syracuse, New York
Burials at Oakwood Cemetery (Syracuse, New York)
Syracuse Stars (baseball)
19th-century American businesspeople